Rafał Brzoska (born 1977) is a Polish entrepreneur who is the founder and president of the Integer.pl Capital Group.

Biography 
Brzoska attended Jan Kasprowicz High School in Racibórz, Poland and later the Kraków University of Economics.

During his third year at university, he founded Integer, initially a website design business, with capital of 20,000 złoty ($5,000 as of 1999). After several money-losing months, the company switched to distributing leaflets and became successful.

In 2012, he appeared on a list of the richest Poles, and in 2015 was ranked the 68th on Forbes' "List of the 100 richest Poles 2015."

In 2019, Brzoska married the Polish journalist and television personality Omenaa Mensah. They have one son, Vincent, who was born in 2017. Brzoska has two daughters from a previous relationship.

As of 2021 Brzoska's net worth is estimated at 5 billion złoty (1.3 billion USD).

References 

1977 births
Living people
21st-century Polish businesspeople
Kraków University of Economics alumni
People from Racibórz
Polish billionaires